Baltray (historically Ballytra, from ) is a village and townland in County Louth, Ireland. It sits on the northern shore of the River Boyne estuary.

Amenities
The village has developed since the latter half of the twentieth century as a dormitory village serving the nearby town of Drogheda, which is located inland, to the west of Baltray. Baltray has a public house.

Baltray is home to the County Louth Golf Club. This links course has hosted several championships over its history, including the Irish Open in 2004 and 2009.

The area is also known for the "Baltray standing stones", a group of megaliths.

Transport
Bus Éireann route 189 serves Baltray several times a day (but not Sundays) linking it to Drogheda, Duleek, Ashbourne, Termonfeckin and Clogherhead. Drogheda railway station is approximately 8 km distant.

Conservation
Baltray is home to the Little Tern Conservation Project which is run by Louth Nature Trust.  The project began in 2007 and runs each year from May to August when part of the beach at the Haven is fenced to protect nesting Little Terns.  These birds are an Annex 1 species under the EU Birds Directive (79/409/EEC), thus EU member states are required to take special conservation measures to ensure that little terns remain at a favourable conservation status.

References

Towns and villages in County Louth
Townlands of County Louth